Alternaria senecionis is a fungal plant pathogen.

References

External links

senecionis
Fungal plant pathogens and diseases
Fungi described in 1946